KKIC-LD (channel 16) is a low-powered television station in Boise, Idaho, United States, affiliated with the Spanish-language Estrella TV network. Founded November 10, 1993, It is owned by Cocola Broadcasting.

Subchannels
The station's digital signal is multiplexed:

External links
Estrella TV official site

KIC-LD
Television channels and stations established in 2001
Spanish-language television stations in the United States
2001 establishments in Idaho
Low-power television stations in the United States